The following is a list of notable judgments of the European Court of Justice.

Principles of Union Law

Direct effect

Treaties, Regulations and Decisions 

 Van Gend en Loos 26/62 [1963] ECR 1
"The [European Economic] Community constitutes a new legal order of international law for the benefit of which the [Member] States have limited their sovereign rights".

"The Court ... has the jurisdiction to answer ... questions referred that ... relate to the interpretation of the treaty."

 Franz Grad 9/70 [1970] ECR-825
 Commission v Italy 39/72 [1973] ECR 101
 Reyners 2/74 [1974] ECR 631
 Defrenne II [1976] ECR 455
 Amsterdam Bulb 50/76 [1977] ECR 137

States can provide in national legislation for appropriate sanctions which are not provided for in the regulation, and can continue to regulate various related issues which are not covered in the regulation

 Zaera 126/86 [1987] ECR 3697
 Azienda Agricola C-403/98 [2001] ECR I-103
Steinberg T-17/10 [2012] 625
Sharif University T-181/13 [2014] 607

Directives 

 Van Duyn v Home Office 41/74 [1974] ECR 1337
 Ratti 148/78 [1979] ECR 1629

Member States are precluded by their failure to implement a directive properly from refusing to recognise its binding effect in cases where it is pleaded against them, thus they cannot rely on their failure to implement the directive in time.

 Becker 8/81 [1982] ECR 53
 von Colson 14/83 [1984] ECR 1891
 Kolpinghuis Nijmegen 80/86 [1987] ECR 3969

There is no obligation of harmonious interpretation where the national measure, interpreted in the light of the directive, would impose criminal liability.

 Fratelli Costanzo 103/88 [1989] ECR 1839
 Foster C-188/89 [1990] ECR I-3313
 Marshall v Southampton and South-West Hampshire Area Health Authority Case 152/84 [1986] ECR I-4367
 Faccini Dori C-91/92 [1994] ECR I-3325
 CIA Security C-194/94 [1996] ECR I-2201
 Arcaro C-168/95 [1996] ECR I-4705

Notwithstanding the Kolpinghuis ruling, the creation of any other kind of legal disadvantage of detriment, save for criminal liability, is very well possible.

 Unilever Italia C-443/98 [2000] ECR I-7535
Commission v Spain, case C-417/99, 13 September 2001: failure to designate the competent authorities and bodies responsible for implementing Directive 96/62/EC on ambient air quality. Directives are to be transposed into national law "with precision, clarity and transparency".

Primacy 
 Costa v ENEL 6/64 [1964] ECR 585
Community law takes precedence over the Member States' own domestic law.

Simmenthal II 106/77 [1978] ECR 629
Duty to set aside provisions of national law which are incompatible with Community law. The Court ruled that:

Marleasing C-106/89 ECR I-7321
National law must be interpreted and applied, insofar as possible, so as to avoid a conflict with a Community rule.

Factortame I C-213/89 [1990] ECR I-2433
Duty on national courts to secure the full effectiveness of Community law, even where it is necessary to create a national remedy where none had previously existed.

Enforcement of EU law
EU law has not established its own system for its enforcement or for aggrieved parties to seek remedies for breach of EU law. In the absence of such a system,
Joined Cases C-430/93 and C-431/93 Van Schijndel and van Veen introduced the principles of equivalence and effectiveness
Joined Cases C-222/05 to C-225/05, van der Weerd et al: Community law does not require a national court ... to raise of its own motion a plea alleging infringement of the provisions of Community legislation, since neither the principle of equivalence nor the principle of effectiveness require it to do so.

Rejection of the reciprocity principles of general international law 
Commission v. Luxembourg and Belgium, joined cases 90 and 91/63 [1964] ECR 625
"[I]n [the defendants'] view, … international law allows a party, injured by the failure of another party to perform its obligations, to withhold performance of its own … However, this relationship between the obligations of parties cannot be recognized under Community law ... The treaty is not limited to creating reciprocal obligations ... but establishes a new legal order ... [T]he basic concept of the treaty requires that the Member States not take the law into their own hands."

Fundamental rights 

Stauder 29/69 [1969] ECR 419
"Fundamental rights [are] enshrined in the general principles of Community law and protected by the Court."

Internationale Handelsgesellschaft 11/70 [1970] ECR 1125
Fundamental rights are an integral part of the general principles of law the observance of which the Court ensures.

 Nold 4/73 [1974] ECR 491, §13
When protecting fundamental rights, "the Court is bound to draw inspiration from constitutional traditions common to the Member States, and it cannot therefore uphold measures which are incompatible with fundamental rights recognised and protected by the Constitutions of those States." The Court can also draw on international human rights treaties to which Member States have collaborated or are signatories.

 Carpenter C-60/00 [2002] ECR I-6279
Fundamental rights affect the scope and application of Community law. In Carpenter, the Court weaved principles of respect for family and private life from Article 8 of the European Convention on Human Rights into its analysis of the rights of Union citizens. It concluded that the right of a minor child to reside in a Member State under Community law brought with it a corollary right for his mother to reside there as well.

 Test Achats vs Council of Ministers
The legislative organs of the union cannot make laws which allow private sector organisations to discriminate on the grounds of gender even if such discrimination is based on relevant and accurate actuarial and statistical data.

Minister voor Immigratie en Asiel C-199/12 [2013] 720

Law of the institutions

Acts 

Mandelli 3/67 [1968] ECR 25
Acts of the European institutions must be supported by sufficient reasoning, the validity of which shall be examined by the Court.

Legislative process 

 Variola 34/73 [1973] ECR 981
 Roquette Frères v Council 138/79 [1980] ECR 3333
 Germany v Commission 24/62 [1963] ECR 131
 Tariff Preferences case 45/86 [1987] ECR 1493
 Beus 5/67 [1968] ECR 83
 Tobacco Advertising case C-376/98 [2000] ECR I-8419
 Opinion 2/94 [1996] ECR I-1759
The European Community does not have the power under the treaties to accede to the European Convention on Human Rights.

 Parliament v Council C-65/93 [1995] ECR I-643

Liability 

 Plaumann v Commission 25/62 [1963] ECR 199

The Plaumann test sets out the criteria for non-privileged applicants to prove individual concern: 'Applicants must show that the decision affects them by reason of certain attributes which are peculiar to them or by reason of circumstances in which they are differentiated from all other persons and by virtue of these factors distinguishes them individually just as in the case of the person addressed.'

 Codorníu v Council C-309/89 [1994] ECR I-1853

In this case the court took a more liberal approach than the restrictive Plaumann test for establishing individual concern, which was, however, not followed in judgements thereafter.

Interim orders
Article 186 of the Treaty of Rome stated that the Court "may, in any cases referred to it, make any necessary interim order". Article 39 of the Treaty of Nice's Protocol on the Statute of the Court of Justice (2001) states that "the President of the Court may, by way of summary procedure ... prescribe interim measures in pursuance of Article 243 of the EC Treaty or Article 158 of the EAEC Treaty".

In Commission of the European Communities v Kingdom of Belgium (1994), the president dismissed an application for interim measures submitted by the commission on 11 March 1994 because the commission had "not displayed the diligence to be expected". The commission had been aware of an alleged breach of the procurement directives in October 1993, and had referred on 8 February 1994 to its "intention" to seek the suspension of a public supplies contract, but did not apply for an interim order until 11 March 1994.

Competition 
Leading cases on competition law include Consten & Grundig v Commission and United Brands v Commission.

Case C-231/03: Coname v Comune di Cingia de' Botti in Italy (competition and free movement of persons). The court established that transparency obligations apply to the award of a concession for the management of the public gas distribution service.
Case C-501/06 P: GlaxoSmithKline Services and Others v Commission and Others, joined with cases C-513/06 P, C-515/06 P and C‑519/06 P: four appeals brought under Article 56 of the Statute of the Court of Justice, 2006, regarding Article 81 of the Treaty of Rome.
Prezes Urzędu Ochrony Konkurencji i Konsumentów v Tele2 Polska sp. z o.o. (now Netia SA): the Polish national competition authority determined that Telekomunikacja Polska SA was not abusing a dominant position on the market. The ECJ ruled that only the European Commission has competence to make such a decision.
Simba Toys T-450/09 [2014] 983
C-68/12 - Slovenská sporiteľňa et al. - three banks colluded against a non-banking financial institution which was alleged to be  operating illegally in the Slovak Republic. The court ruled that the allegation of illegal operation was irrelevant to determining whether the banks' collusion interfered with the structure of the market and in particular with  the interests of competition itself.
Anti-competitive behaviour and concerted practices in the international air freight forwarding services market:
Case C-261/16: P Kuhne + Nagel International and others v European Commission, regarding a cartel agreeing surcharges on export declarations, referred to as the "new export system" cartel
Case C-263/16: P Schenker v Commission
Case C-264/16: P Deutsche Bahn and others v Commission
Case C-271/16: P Panalpina World Transport (Holding) and others v Commission
- judgments issued collectively on 1 February 2018. The other cartels referred to in the judgment were those known as the "advanced manifest system" cartel, the "peak season surcharge" cartel and the "currency adjustment factor" cartel.

Data protection
Case C-362/14 – Maximillian Schrems v Data Protection Commissioner, reference for a preliminary ruling from the High Court of Ireland made on 25 July 2014, published 6 October 2015.

Employment

Case C-186/83: Arie Botzen and others v Rotterdamsche Droogdok Maatschappij BV, leading case on the meaning of "assignment" in relation to the part of an undertaking or business to which [employees] are "assigned" to carry out [their] duties for purposes of the TUPE directive.
Case C-24/85, Spijkers v Gebroeders Benedik Abattoir CV

External relations 

Commission v Council relating to the European Road Transport Agreement (ERTA), [1971] ECR 263

External trade
Portugal v Council, case C-149/96: application made by the government of Portugal for the annulment of Council Decision 96/386/EC of 26 February 1996 concerning the conclusion of Memoranda of Understanding between the European Community and the Islamic Republic of Pakistan (signed 31 December 1994) and between the European Community and the Republic of India (signed 15 October 1994) on arrangements in the area of market access for textile products. Among other concerns, the Portuguese government argued that the principle of transparency had been breached, because the contested decision approved Memoranda of Understanding which were "not adequately structured and are drafted in obscure terms which prevent a normal reader from immediately grasping all their implications, in particular as regards their retroactive application". In support of this plea, Portugal relied on a European Council resolution of 8 June 1993 on the quality of drafting of Community legislation. In this respect, the Court ruled that the 1993 resolution had no binding effect and that in any case, "the decision appears to be clear in every aspect".

Intellectual property rights
Joined cases C-446/09 and C-495/09 concerned the interpretation of EU legislation governing action by customs authorities against possible infringements of intellectual property rights when suspected goods were within the EU for "external transit" purposes.
In SAS Institute Inc v World Programming Ltd. (C-406/10), the court ruled that copyright protection does not extend to software functionality, the programming language used, or the format of the data files used by a software program.

Internal market

Free movement of goods

Definition of "goods" 
 Commission v Italy ("Italian Art") 7/68 [1968] ECR 423
'Goods' are "products which can be valued in money and which are capable, as such, of forming the subject of commercial transactions".

 Commission v Belgium C-2/90 [1992] ECR I-4431
"Waste, whether recyclable or not, is to be regarded as 'goods'."

Customs duties and equivalent charges 

Articles 23 and 25 EC prohibit as between Member States all "customs duties on imports and exports and of all charges having equivalent effect". The prohibition in Article 25 also applies to customs duties of a fiscal nature.

 Commission v Italy ('Italian statistical data') 24/68 [1969] ECR 193
Customs charges are prohibited because "any pecuniary charge, however small, imposed on goods by reason of the fact that they cross a frontier constitutes an obstacle to the movement of such goods."

 Diamantarbeiders 2/69 and 3/69 [1969] ECR 211
A charge having equivalent effect to a customs duty is "any pecuniary charge however small and whatever its designation and mode of application which is imposed unilaterally on domestic or foreign goods by reason of the fact that they cross a frontier and which is not a customs duty in the strict sense." This is the case "even if it is not imposed for the benefit of the State [and] is not discriminatory or protective in effect, or if the product on which the charge is imposed is not in competition with any domestic product."

 Bresciani 87/75 [1976] ECR 129
Charges imposed for a public health inspection carried out on the entry of goods to a Member State can be a charge having equivalent effect to a customs duty. It was not important that the charges were proportionate to the costs of the inspection, nor that such inspections were in the public interest.

 Commission v Germany 18/87 [1988] ECR 5427
A charge for a service will not be regarded as a customs duty where it: (a) does not exceed the cost of the service, (b) that service is obligatory and applied uniformly for all the goods concerned, (c) the service fulfills obligations prescribed by Community law, and (d) the service promotes the free movement of goods in particular by neutralising obstacles which may arise from unilateral measures of inspection.

Indirect taxation 

Article 110 EC prevents any Member State from imposing, "directly or indirectly, on the products of other Member States any internal taxation of any kind in excess of that imposed directly or indirectly on similar domestic products". This prohibition also extends to "internal taxation of such a nature as to afford indirect protection to other products".

 Humblot 112/84 [1985] ECR 1367

Quantitative restrictions 

Article 34 EC bans "quantitative restrictions on imports and all measures having equivalent effect shall be prohibited between Member States", the same provision in respect of exports is found in Article 35 EC.

 Geddo v Ente 2/73 [1973] ECR 865
Quantitative restrictions are "measures which amount to a total or partial restraint of, according to the circumstances, imports, exports or goods in transit."

Measures having Equivalent effect to a Quantitative Restriction (MEQRs)

Procureur du Roi v Dassonville 8/74 [1974] ECR 837
The following are prohibited as Measures having Equivalent effect to a Quantitative Restriction (MEQRs): "all trading rules enacted by Member States which are capable of hindering, directly or indirectly, actually or potentially, intra-Community trade."

 Commission v Ireland 249/81 [1982] ECR 4005
 Commission v UK 207/83 [1985] ECR 1201

Justification 

Article 36 EC exempts quantitative restrictions which are justified on grounds of "public morality, public policy or public security; the protection of health and life of humans, animals or plants; the protection of national treasures possessing artistic, historic or archaeological value; or the protection of industrial and commercial property". The restrictions must not, in any case, "constitute a means of arbitrary discrimination or a disguised restriction on trade between Member States".

Cassis de Dijon 120/78 [1979] ECR 649
 Henn and Darby 34/79 [1979] ECR 3795
Keck and Mithouard C-267/91 and C-268/91 [1993] ECR I-6097
 Torfaen Borough Council C-145/88 [1989] ECR 3851

Product liability
The Product Liability Directive aims to ensure undistorted competition between economic operators, to facilitate the free movement of goods and to avoid differences in levels of consumer protection.
Case-495/10 - Centre hospitalier universitaire de Besançon v Thomas Dutrueux, Caisse primaire d'assurance maladie du Jura, 21 December 2011: The directive is not intended "exhaustively to harmonise the sphere of liability for defective products beyond its own area of application", which concerns producer and importer liability for defective products. A French healthcare law which also imposes a form of no-fault liability on public hospitals is therefore not incompatible with the directive.

Free movement of persons

Workers 
 Hoekstra 75/63 [1964] ECR 347
 Sotgiu 152/73 [1974] ECR 153
 Van Duyn 41/74 [1974] ECR 1337
 Levin 53/81 [1982] ECR 1035
 Lawrie-Blum 66/85 [1986] ECR 2121
Union nationale des entraîneurs et cadres techniques professionnels du football (Unectef) v Georges Heylens and others, C-222/86, judgment dated 15 October 1987, ruled that it must be possible for a worker to challenge a refusal to recognise the equivalence of a diploma. George Heylens in this case was a Belgian footballer. French rules at the time required a foorball trainer working in France to have a French qualification.
 Bettray 344/87 [1989] ECR 1621
 Groener C-379/87 [1989] ECR 3967
 Antonissen C-292/89 [1991] ECR I-745
 Bosman C-415/93[1995] ECR I-4921
 Angonese C-281/98 [2000] ECR I-4139
  Trojani C-456/02 [2004] ECR I-07573

Citizenship 
 Grzelczyk C-184/99 [2001] ECR I-6193
 Garcia Avello C-148/02 [2003] ECR I-11613
 Collins C-138/02 [2004] ECR I-2703
 Zhu and Chen C-200/02 [2004] ECR I-9925
 Metock and Others C-127/08 [2008] ECR I-6241
Libert et al v Gouvernement flamand (Flemish Government), Case C-197/11, found that a decree of the Flemish Region dated 27 March 2009 on land and real estate, which restricted transfer of certain land to persons with a "sufficient connection" with the local community, breached the Citizens' Rights Directive, 2004/38/EC. The case was joined with case C-203/11.

Freedom of establishment and to provide services

Establishment 

 Reyners 2/74 [1974] ECR 631
 Thieffry 71/76 [1977] ECR 765
 Factortame II C-221/89 [1991] ECR I-3905
 Vlassopoulou 340/89 [1991] ECR 2357
Centros C-212/97 [1999] ECR I-1459
Überseering C-208/00 [2002] ECR I-9919
Joined cases C-186/11 and C-209/11 Stanleybet et al. v. Organismos prognostikon agonon podosfairou AE (OPAP) regarding OPAP's monopoly betting licence under Greek national law.

Services 

 van Binsbergen 33/74 [1974] ECR 1299
 Cowan 186/87 [1989] ECR 195
Rush Portuguesa C-113/89 [1990] ECR I-1417
 Gebhard C-55/94 [1995] ECR I-4165
 Bosman C-415/93[1995] ECR I-4921
Case C-393/05, Commission v Austria, concerning the Austrian requirement that every inspection body in the field of organic agriculture with a registered office outside Austria must also maintain an office inside Austria. The Court held that this requirement was a disproportionate restriction on freedom to provide services.
Case C-434/15, Asociación Profesional Elite Taxi v Uber Systems Spain SL: the service provided by Uber connecting individuals with vehicle drivers is to be classified as a service in the field of transport.

Jurisdiction and the recognition and enforcement of judgments
Marco Gambazzi v DaimlerChrysler Canada Inc. and CIBC Mellon Trust Company, Case C–394/07, concerned implementation of the public policy clause of the Brussels Convention (now the Brussels I Regulation). In this case, the court ruled that the Italian courts (and potentially other courts of member states) could decline to enforce a default judgment entered against Mr Gambazzi in the UK courts if, following a "comprehensive assessment of the proceedings", the court considered that the default judgment in the absence of the defendant "constituted a manifest and disproportionate infringement of [his] right to be heard".
Car Trim GmbH v KeySafety Systems SrL (case C-381/08) and Electrosteel Europe sa v Edil Centro SpA, (case C-87/10): two linked cases regarding the place of "performance" of a contractual obligation, which may be used to determine the national court with jurisdiction in a civil or commercial matter. This will in general be the place of delivery in relation to a contract for the sale of goods. These cases looked at situations where goods were made available for delivery to a purchaser in another member state. The terms of the contract should first be considered to determine where "delivery" is to take place, but if this is not possible (not knowing which member state's substantive contract law is to apply), the place where goods are physically handed over to the purchaser or their agent will determine the place of performance.
Pammer v. Karl Schlütter GmbH & Co. KG (case C-585/08) and Hotel Alpenhof v. Mr. Heller (case C-144/09), 2010: see Pammer and Alpenhof cases

Procurement

Procurement procedures of entities operating in the water, energy, transport and postal services sectors
Case C-394-02: Commission of the European Communities v Hellenic Republic. Circumstances following an environmental impact assessment with a deadline for implementation did not qualify as "extreme urgency" for the purposes of justifying a negotiated contract being agreed without advertising an opportunity for other companies to express interest. See Public Power Corporation#Legal issues.
Case C-206/08: Wasser- und Abwasserzweckverband Gotha und Landkreisgemeinden (WAZV Gotha) v Eurawasser Aufbereitungs- und Entsorgungsgesellschaft mbH. Ruled in relation to a contract for the supply of services, that "the fact that the supplier does not receive consideration directly from the contracting authority, but is entitled to collect payment under private law from third parties, is sufficient for the contract in question to be categorised as a 'service concession' within the meaning of Article 1(3)(b) of Directive 2004/17/EC of the European Parliament and of the council of 31 March 2004".

Public procurement
Case 31/87 Gebroeders Beentjes BV v State of the Netherlands on the interpretation of Council Directive 71/305/EEC of 26 July 1971 concerning the coordination of procedures for the award of public works contracts: a "social consideration" such as a condition relating to the employment of long-term unemployed persons is compatible with the public works directive if it has no direct or indirect discriminatory effect on tenderers from other Member States of the Community.
Case C-107/92 Commission v Italian Republic – an urgent need had arisen to construct an avalanche barrier in the Alpe Gallina region near Colle Isarco and Brenner in the South Tyrol, following publication of a geological report in June 1988 recommending in advance of the 1988-89 winter. The Italian government appointed a contractor without advertising in the Official Journal of the European Communities on the grounds of urgency, but the European Commission argued, and the Court agreed, that there was sufficient time to advertise the works opportunity under the accelerated procedure as defined in section 15 of the Directive on Public Works Contracts (Directive 71/305/EEC).
Case C-97/94, Commission v Belgium: contracting authorities have "a degree of choice" as to which procurement procedure they follow for each procurement exercise, but "once they have issued an invitation to tender under one particular procedure, they are required to observe the rules applicable to it until the contract has been finally awarded". In this case, brought by the Commission of the European Communities against the Kingdom of Belgium, the Belgian government argued that although this tender for the supply of buses for public transport in the Walloon region had been issued using the "Open Procedure", the "negotiated procedure" could have been used instead. The court stated that subsequently changing the procedure in order to negotiate (or accept further post-tender information) was not permitted.
Case C-225/98 Commission v French Republic – ruled that the Nord-Pas-de-Calais region and the Département du Nord had failed to fulfil their legal obligations through the use of employment criteria in the technical specification used when contracting for the construction and maintenance of school buildings. However, the court ruled that where a contracting authority had to assess two or more economically equivalent bids, they could adopt employment opportunities as an "accessory criterion" as long as the use of this criterion was not discriminatory.
Case C-237/99 Commission v French Republic – ruled that the French public housing institutions, offices publics d'aménagement et de construction (OPAC, public development and construction entities) and societes anonymes habitations à loyer modéré (SA HTMs, low-rent housing corporations) met the criteria in the then-applicable public works contracts directive (Council Directive 93/37/EEC) for being treated as a "body governed by public law" according to article 1(b) of the directive:
a body established for the specific purpose of meeting needs in the general interest, not having an industrial or commercial character,
having legal personality, and
[either]
financed, for the most part, by the State, or regional or local authorities, or other bodies governed by public law, or
subject to management supervision by those bodies, or
having an administrative, managerial or supervisory board, more than half of whose members are appointed by the State, regional or local authorities or by other bodies governed by public law. Accordingly they were subject to the obligation to publish relevant above-threshold contracts in the Official Journal of the European Communities.
Case C-444/06 Commission v. Spain: the Spanish public procurement rules did not adequately transpose the requirements of Council Directive 89/665/EEC on the coordination of the laws, regulations and administrative provisions relating to the application of review procedures to the award of public supply and public works contracts, as amended by Council Directive 92/50/EEC of 18 June 1992. However, in regard to some provisions in Spanish law intended to preserve the effects of a contract subject to an administrative declaration of invalidity and to maintain continuity of public service provision, the Court found that the commission had not demonstrated that the legislation undermined the requirements of the review directive.
Case C‑450/06, Varec SA v Belgian State, 14 February 2008: a review body must ensure that confidentiality and business secrecy are respected. The review body itself is responsible for determining how this can best be done whilst also providing effective legal protection and respecting the rights of the parties to the dispute under review to conduct their defence.
Case C-456/08, Commission v Ireland: Order 84A of the Rules of the Superior Courts in Ireland required procurement review actions to be brought "at the earliest opportunity and in any event within three months". The Court ruled that this wording left disappointed bidders "in uncertainty regarding their position when they consider making use of their Community law right to effective legal remedy against a decision of a contracting authority". A new Order 84A was issued by the Irish Government on 8 September 2010 which is now consistent with EU law. This requires that actions be brought within 30 calendar days of when the claimant "knew or ought to have known" of the alleged infringement".
Case C-599/10, SAG ELV Slovensko a.s. and others v Úrad pre verejné obstarávanie, referral from the Najvyšší súd Slovenskej republiky (Supreme Court of the Slovak Republic). In a case where a tender is imprecise or does not meet the technical requirements of the specification, there is no obligation to consult the tenderer or to ask for a clarification, and to do so would conflict with the principle of equal treatment of tenderers. There is a duty to request clarification of an abnormally low price and in this case the contracting authority "must set out clearly its request for clarification".
Case C-182/11, Econord SpA v Comune di Cagno et al., 29 November 2012: control "similar to the control which [a local authority] exercises over its own departments" is maintained where the authority holds capital in a public entity and also plays "a role in its managing bodies". Joined case with case C-183/11.
Case C-552/13, Grupo Hospitalario Quirón SA v Departamento de Sanidad del Gobierno Vasco and Instituto de Religiosas Siervas de Jesús de la Caridad, confirmed that the 2004 Directive on Public Procurement did not permit a tender for medical services to state as a requirement that the proposed services must be provided within the boundaries of a particular locality, in this case the municipality of Bilbao. A more general proximity requirement in the specification, more easily justifiable, was not criticised by the court.
Case T-4/13 - Communicaid Group Ltd. v European Commission, a case in the General Court of the European Union. Communicaid, a London-based language-training company challenged a procurement award decision made by the Commission and requested that the proposed contract award be suspended. The challenge was dismissed as Communicaid had failed to establish why urgent measures were required.
Case C-413/17 – Roche Lietuva, related to the detailed formulation of technical specifications.

Social policy 
Defrenne III C-149/77 [1978] ECR 1365: the scope of article 119 does not extend beyond equal pay, but the elimination of sex discrimination is a fundamental principle of Community law.
Bundesdruckerei v. Stadt Dortmund, Case C-549/13: the City of Dortmund could not require tenderers for a document digitalisation contract to commit to paying German minimum wage levels to the workforce when they were intending to sub-contract the performance of the contract to a firm based in Poland outside the scope of the German minimum wage law.

State liability 

 Francovich and Bonifaci C-6/90 and C-9/90 [1991] ECR I-5357
 Brasserie du Pêcheur / Factortame III C-46/93 and C-48/93 [1996] ECR I-1029
 British Telecom C-392/93 [1996] ECR I-1631
 Faccini Dori C-91/92 [1994] ECR I-3325
 Köbler C-224/01 [2003] ECR I-10239
ClientEarth C-404/13 [2014] 2382
Elisabeta Dano and Florin Dano C-333/13 [2014] 2358

Taxation

Value added tax
C-97/90 – Lennartz v Finanzamt München III: reference for a preliminary ruling on VAT paid on the purchase of capital goods.
Axel Kittel & Recolta Recycling SPRL (cases C-439/04 and C-440/04, issued 6 July 2006) (known as Kittel), a missing trader fraud case. Under the Kittel ruling, "the right to claim input tax could be denied to anyone in the supply chain if the trader knew or should have known that their transactions were connected with VAT fraud".

VAT groups
Taxation barrister Philip Simpson refers to "the three main ECJ cases" on VAT groups as:
Case C-162/07, Ampliscientifica and Amplifin v. Ministero dell’Economia e delle Finanze, (2008, Italy) ECR I-4019: Italy had failed to consult the EU's VAT Committee in accordance with Article 11 of the Sixth VAT Directive
Case C-7/13 Skandia America Corp (USA) v. Skatteverket (the Swedish Tax Agency), 14 September 2014
Cases C-108/14 and C-109/14 (conjoined), Larentia + Minerva and Marenave, 16 July 2015.

A separate ruling is Case C-355/06, van der Steen (2007), a case which Simpson refers to as "not terribly clear".

Fifty-seven pre-accession cases
The following is the official list of fifty-seven cases that were translated in preparation for new member states who joined the European Union in 2004. The list below contains fifty case names, because some cases were joined.

NV Algemene Transport- en Expeditie Onderneming van Gend & Loos v Nederlandse administratie der belastingen (1963) Case 26/62
Plaumann & Co. v Commission (1963) Case 25/62
Flaminio Costa v E.N.E.L. (1964) Case 6/64
Établissements Consten S.à.R.L. and Grundig-Verkaufs-GmbH v Commission (1966) Case 56-58/64
Commission v Council (1971) Case 22/70
Aktien-Zuckerfabrik Schöppenstedt v Council (1971) Case 5/71
Jean Reyners v Belgian State (1974) Case 2/74
Procureur du Roi v Benoît in Gustave Dassonville (1974) Case 8/74
Yvonne van Duyn v Home Office (1974) Case 41/74
Gabrielle Defrenne v Société anonyme belge de navigation aérienne Sabena (1976) Case 43/75
Amministrazione delle Finanze dello Stato v Simmenthal SpA (1978) Case 106/77
Rewe-Zentral AG v Bundesmonopolverwaltung für Branntwein (1979) Case 120/78
Liselotte Hauer v Land Rheinland-Pfalz (1979) Case 44/79
SA Roquette Frères v Council (1980) Case 138/79
Commission v Belgium (1980) Case 149/79
Ursula Becker v Finanzamt Münster-Innenstadt (1982) Case 8/81
France, Italy and United Kingdom v Commission (1982) Cases 188-190/80
Srl CILFIT et Lanificio di Gavardo SpA v Ministero della sanità (1982) Case 283/81 
Sabine von Colson in Elisabeth Kamann v Land Nordrhein-Westfalen (1984) Case 14/83 
Parti écologiste “Les Verts” v Parliament (1986) Case 294/83
Marguerite Johnston v Chief Constable of the Royal Ulster Constabulary (1986) Case 222/84
Commission v Germany (1987) Case 178/84
Commission v Council (1987) Case 45/86
Foto-Frost v Hauptzollamt Lübeck-Ost (1987) Case 314/85
Pascal Van Eycke v Société anonyme ASPA (1988) Case 267/86
Hoechst AG v Commission (1989) Cases 46/87 and 227/88
Parliament v Council (1990) Case C-70/88
R v Secretary of State for Transport, ex parte Factortame Ltd (1990) Case C-213/89 
Zuckerfabrik Süderdithmarschen AG v Hauptzollamt Itzehoe and Zuckerfabrik Soest GmbH v Hauptzollamt Paderborn (1991) C-143/88 in C-92/89
Andrea Francovich in Danila Bonifaci v Italy (1991) C-6/90 in C-9/90
Opinion of the Court under article 288 (1991) Opinion 1/91
Telemarsicabruzzo SpA v Circostel in Ministero delle Poste e Telecomunicazioni in Ministero della Difesa (1993) C-320/90, C-321/90 in C-322/90
Bernard Keck and Daniel Mithouard (1993) C-267/91 and C-268/91
Paola Faccini Dori v Recreb Srl (1994) Case C-91/92
Competence of the Community to conclude international agreements concerning services and the protection of intellectual property (1994) Opinion 1/94
Alpine Investments BV v Minister van Financiën (1995) Case C-384/93
Reinhard Gebhard v Consiglio dell'Ordine degli Avvocati e Procuratori di Milano (1995) Case C-55/94 
Union royale belge des sociétés de football association ASBL v Jean-Marc Bosman (1995) Case C-415/93
Brasserie du Pêcheur SA v Bundesrepublik Deutschland and R v Secretary of State for Transport, ex parte: Factortame Ltd (1996) C-46/93 and C-48/93
Community accession to the Convention for the Protection of Human Rights and Fundamental Freedoms (1996) Opinion 2/94
CIA Security International SA v Signalson SA and Securitel SPRL (1996) Case C-194/94
Hellmut Marschall v Land Nordrhein-Westfalen (1997) Case C-409/95
Commission v France (1997) Case C-265/95
Inter-Environnement Wallonie ASBL v Région wallonne (1997) Case C-129/96 
María Martínez Sala v Freistaat Bayern (1998) Case C-85/96 
A. Racke GmbH & Co. v Hauptzollamt Mainz (1998) Case C-162/96 
Centros Ltd v Erhvervs- og Selskabsstyrelsen (1999) Case C-212/97
Albany International BV v Stichting Bedrijfspensioenfonds Textielindustrie (1999) Case C-67/96
Dieter Krombach v André Bamberski (2000) Case C-7/98
Germany v Parliament (2000) Case C-376/98

Notes

References

 Becht, Marco, Mayer, Colin and Wagner, Hannes F., "Where Do Firms Incorporate? Deregulation and the Cost of Entry" (August 2007). ECGI – Law Working Paper No. 70/2006 (documents effect of Centros and Überseering decisions on incorporation mobility of companies)

External links
Official list of 57 pre-2001 judgments and 79 2001-2004 judgments for Accession countries

Rulings